Kalugapulikkadu is a village in the Pattukkottai taluk of Thanjavur district, Tamil Nadu, India.

Demographics 

As per the 2001 census, Kalugapulikkadu had a total population of 1958 with 987 males and 971 females. The sex ratio was 984. The literacy rate was 66.51.

References 

 

Villages in Thanjavur district